Sergey Valentinovich Novikov (— Siarhei Valiancinavich Novikau; born 27 April 1979) is a retired Belarusian biathlete. He competed at the 2006, 2010 and 2014 Olympics in four-five events at each Games: 10 km sprint, 12.5 km pursuit, 15 km mass start, 20 km race and 4 × 7.5 km relay. He won a silver medal, shared with Ole Einar Bjørndalen, in the 20 km individual race in 2010.

Novikov retired from the sport at the end of the 2013-14 season.

References

External links

 Profile on biathlonworld.com

1979 births
Living people
Belarusian male biathletes
Olympic biathletes of Belarus
Biathletes at the 2006 Winter Olympics
Biathletes at the 2010 Winter Olympics
Biathletes at the 2014 Winter Olympics
Olympic silver medalists for Belarus
Olympic medalists in biathlon
Biathlon World Championships medalists
Medalists at the 2010 Winter Olympics
Mogilev State A. Kuleshov University alumni
Universiade bronze medalists for Belarus
Universiade medalists in biathlon
Competitors at the 2001 Winter Universiade
Competitors at the 2007 Winter Universiade